Crescent Head is a town on the Tasman Sea coast, 340 km north-northeast of Sydney, in Kempsey Shire, New South Wales, Australia. At the 2011 census, Crescent Head had a population of 1,586 people. Its major industries include tourism and fishing. It has a 6-hole golf course overlooking the sea.

History
Crescent Head was officially declared a village in 1894, but the first mention of Crescent Head had appeared in 1833 from the NSW Calendar and General Post Office Directory.

Excerpt from the General Post Office Directory 1833: "From Port Macquarie northerly there is a beaten track and the country may present some obstructions to the formation of a road; travelling is not, however, difficult; the tracks follow the coast which is a succession of sandy beaches extending from Port Macquarie to Point Plomer, thence to Crescent Head and then to Trial Bay..."

In the 1960s and 70s, Crescent Head was a well-known surfing destination, especially for long board surfers. Crescent Head remains a surfing destination and hosts the Malibu Classic each year.

Demographics
In 2011, there were 439 families residing in Crescent Head with an average of 1.9 children per family.

2011 Estimated Population Data by Gender/Age 
51.3% Male
48.7% Female
47.0 Est. Average Age
17.4% Population 0-14 Years
14.6% Population Over 65

2011 Registered Marital Status 
Married 43.0%
Separated 5.4%
Divorced 12.8%
Widowed 6.3%
Never Married 32.5%

2011 Religious Affiliation  
Anglican 24.5%
No Religion 24.2%
Catholic 22.7%
Uniting Church 5.3%
Presbyterian and Reformed 2.6%

2011 Languages Spoken at Home  
English 93.9% 
German 0.4% 
French 0.4%
Norwegian 0.2%
Polish 0.2%

Attractions

Beaches
Delicate Beach, which is located just south of Crescent Head, is a beautiful beach for swimming and simply enjoying nature. Camping and fishing are also popular activities at this beach. Swimming with caution is advised as no life guards are present at this beach. Delicate Campground next to it is a dog-friendly campground surrounded by kilometres of sheltered leash-free dog beaches.
Killick Beach is known as one of Australia's best beaches and it serves as the location for the annual Crescent Head Malibu Classic. Surfing conditions are perfect for long boards due to long slow wave breaks. This family-friendly white sand beach also provides sheltered swimming and a playground for children.

Golf
Crescent Head Country Club's six-hole golf course provides stunning ocean views for golfers. Humpback whales can also be viewed from the golf course between May and November (winter-spring season).

Hiking
Big Hill Rainforest Walking Track provides scenic coastal views and lush wildlife. The walking trail includes rainforest vegetation including strangler figs and coastal blackbutt. Microbats are known to inhabit the area and are often spotted at sunset. The trail serves as a good whale watching spot in the spring and winter months.

Art
Banyandah Studio, which is located approximately 15 minutes from Crescent Head, provides a showcase of local art. The studio is also known for its encaustic painting which involves using hot beeswax as paints.  The studio serves as the location for '6Ps Surf Films' and is known to occasionally demonstrate film editing to visitors. The studio is situated on a working alpaca farm.

National Parks
Goolawah National Park is a good place for camping on the beach, surfing, snorkeling, fishing, bird watching and whale watching (during the winter and spring seasons). Dolphins, turtles, koalas and dingoes are often spotted at the park. The beaches are secluded and showcase native local plant life.
Limeburners Creek National Park features native plant life and abundant wildlife, pristine beaches and serves as a great place for swimming, fishing and surfing. There are two camp grounds located within Limeburners Creek National Park: 'Melaleuca Camping Ground' and 'Point Plomer Camping Ground'.

Transportation
Buses run between Crescent Head and Kempsey, two to three times a day. (There is no bus service on Sundays.)

Schools
Ongoing activities and schools in Crescent Head include;

Crescent Head Playgroup  
The playgroup is for both children and their families or carers to attend. It caters to ages 0–5 years old with crafts, music, book reading and other activities. Playgroup is held each Wednesday morning during school terms at the Baker Drive Community Hall.

Crescent Head Community Preschool

Crescent Head Primary School 

Secondary Education 
There are several secondary schools at Kempsey, approximately 22 km away.

Notes

External links
 Crescent Head Tourism Page

Towns in New South Wales
Mid North Coast
Fishing communities in Australia
Coastal towns in New South Wales